Sävar River (Swedish: Sävarån) is a river in Sweden.

References

Rivers of Västerbotten County